Sarah was launched at Liverpool in 1797. She then made six voyages as a slave ship in the triangular trade carrying enslaved people from West Africa to the West Indies. A French privateer captured Sarah in 1804 in a single-ship action on her seventh voyage after Sarah had gathered her slaves but before she could deliver them to the West Indies.

Career 
Sarah entered Lloyd's Register in 1797 with T. Reeves, master, Dickson, owner, and trade Liverpool–Africa. Dolben's Act in 1788 imposed a limit on how many slaves a vessel could carry without penalty. At a burthen of 386 tons, the limit for Sarah was 524 slaves.

1st slave voyage (1797–1798): Captain Thomas Rives acquired a letter of marque on 17 July 1797. Captain Rives sailed from Liverpool on 9 August and started gathering slaves at Bonny on 4 October. Sarah sailed from Africa 21 November, and arrived at Montego Bay on 22 January 1798. She had embarked 520 slaves and she landed 510, for a mortality rate of 2%. She left Jamaica on 6 March and arrived back at Liverpool on 24 April. She had left with 55 crewmen, three of whom died on the voyage.

2nd slave voyage (1798–1799): Captain Rives sailed from Liverpool on 8 September 1799. Sarah arrived at Falmouth, Jamaica, on 26 February 1799, where she landed 511 slaves. She left on 1 May, and arrived back at Liverpool on 29 July. She had left with 62 crew men and she suffered five crew deaths on the voyage.

Captain John Bralsford acquired a letter of marque on 20 September 1799.

3rd slave voyage (1799–1800): Captain John Brelsford (or Brailsford) sailed from Liverpool on 11 October 1799. Sarah gathered her slaves at Bonny and arrived at Kingston, Jamaica, on 21 March 1800 and landed 315 slaves there. She sailed from Kingston on 25 April and arrived back at Liverpool 25 June. She had left Liverpool with 55 crew members and she suffered eight crew deaths on the voyage.

4th slave voyage (1800–1801): Captain Brelsford sailed from Liverpool on 19 October 1800. Sarah gathered her slaves at Bonny and arrived at Kingston on 6 March 1801, where she landed 317 slaves. She sailed from Kingston on 1 April and arrived at Liverpool on 7 June,. She had left with 55 crew members but had only 40 at Kingston, presumably having lost some to desertion at Bonny as she had only four crew deaths on the voyage.

5th slave voyage (1801–1802): Captain Brelsford sailed from Liverpool on 3 August 180a. Sarah gathered her slaves at Bonny and arrived at Kingston on 4 January 1802. There she landed 330 slaves. She sailed from Kingston on 7 February and arrived back at Liverpool on 10 April. She had left Liverpool with 47 crew members and she suffered four crew deaths on the voyage.

6th slave voyage (1802–1803): Captain Thomas Cannell sailed from Liverpool on 21 August 1802. Sarah gathered her slaves at Bonny and arrived at Kingston on 1 February 1803, where she landed 327 slaves. She arrived back at Liverpool on 18 June. She had left Liverpool with 47 crew members and she had suffered four crew deaths on the voyage.

Captain Thomas Cannell acquired a letter of marque on 2 August 1803. He left Liverpool on 13 September with 55 crew members on Sarahs 7th slave voyage.

Fate
Lloyd's Register for 1805 showed Sarah with T. Connell, master, changing to J. Salisbury, Penny & Co., owner, and trade Liverpool–Africa, changing to Liverpool–Lisbon. The entry is annotated with the word "captured".

Lloyd's List reported on 4 May 1804 that Sarah, Cannell, master, had been captured and carried into Guadeloupe.

The French privateer was armed with ten 6-pounder guns and had a crew of 100. When Sarahs captain and first mate were carried below because of their wounds, the crew fled below too. The second mate attempted unsuccessfully to rally them. As Sarahs resistance slackened, the privateer carried her by boarding. British casualties were two killed and 12 wounded. French casualties were three killed and 20 wounded.

In 1805, 30 British slave ships were lost. Eleven were lost in the Middle Passage, while carrying slaves from Africa to the West Indies. War, not maritime hazards nor slave resistance, was the greatest cause of vessel losses among British slave vessels.

Notes

Citations

References
 
 

1797 ships
Age of Sail merchant ships of England
Liverpool slave ships
Captured ships